The Aerospace Cadets of the Philippines or ACP program is a co-educational youth program oriented in aerospace technology, whose aim is to promote national enthusiasm in aviation among the youth and to train them to meet the requirements for leadership and civic service through aerospace education and military training.

History
In March 1969, the Aerospace Association of the Philippines created the Aerospace Cadets of the Philippines. It was for young men and women who have a predilection towards aviation-related industries.

On December 28, 1977, the Department of Education, Culture and Sports (presently the Department of Education) established the ACP program as a substitute for Citizen Army Training requirement, under Department of Education Order #64 series 1977, "The Creation and Organization of Aerospace Cadets of the Philippines".

By 1983, five schools were affiliated with the ACP program, making it a requirement in their curriculum for all students whose citizenship is Filipino. Today, male and female Filipino students of the five ACP-affiliated schools take ACP as one of their subjects.

On May 17, 2001, the DECS Secretary issued DECS Memorandum #166 for the Training Program of the Aerospace Cadets of the Philippines in Selected Private Secondary Schools in the Philippines.

ACP insignia

Logo
The official logo of the Aerospace Cadets of the Philippines consists of two triangles, one inside the other, with "AEROSPACE CADETS OF THE PHILIPPINES" written in between both triangles fringed with three stars.  The inside triangle is blue with a white silhouette of the Philippines and a spaceship superimposed on it.

Symbolism
Triangle - this represents the 'holistic' personality of the youth, bred for courage, honor, loyalty, integrity, and purity to serve God, country and others.
Three Sides - represent the three domains in the total formation of the youth: knowledge, skills and values.
Three Stars - The three geographical divisions of the Philippines: Luzon, Visayas and Mindanao.
The Spaceship at the center of the Philippine map - The desire to stimulate the youth's dreams and aspirations to promote the aviation industry, hand-in-hand with the country's economic development and industrialization.

Colors
White - honor, integrity, purity.
Blue - patriotism, loyalty.
Red - courage, bravery.
Yellow - charity, truth, love.
Green - justice, hope and awareness

Motto
The ACP motto is Study, Decide, Act. Some schools have also adopted mottos specific to their ACP wing, such as Learn and Serve for the ACP wing of Colegio San Agustin-Makati.

Curriculum
The current program of instruction for ACP is 40% Aviation Education, and 60% Leadership, Citizenship and Military training.

Aviation education
Under Aviation Education, students learn about the history of Aviation and current advancements in the field of Aviation technology. It also covers Philippine Aviation, and Philippine Air Force heroes (i.e. Jesús Villamor, Danilo Atienza, César Basa and Antonio Bautista)

Leadership
Students learn to value leadership by respecting their commanding officers, majority of which are students themselves who have earned their rank through training after school hours. Officers, likewise, have to learn not to abuse their power and learn humility, as well as leading by example.

These are the ranks of ACP, from highest to lowest:

Cadet Colonel  (C/COL)
Cadet Lieutenant Colonel (C/LTC)
Cadet Major (C/MAJ)
Cadet Captain (C/CPT)
Cadet First Lieutenant (C/1LT)
Cadet Second Lieutenant (C/2LT)
Cadet Probationary Second Lieutenant (C/P2LT)
Cadet Master Sergeant (C/MSG)
Cadet Technical Sergeant (C/TSG)
Cadet Staff Sergeant (C/SSG)
Cadet Sergeant (C/SGT)
Cadet Airman/Airwoman First Class (C/A1C)
Cadet Airman/Airwoman Second Class (C/A2C)
Cadet Airman/Airwoman (C/AM, C/AW)
Cadet New Recruit  (C/NR)

However, it is also possible to become a medic, flag bearer (also known as a guidon bearer), or member of the air police or marching band of the ACP. Most students begin at the lowest rank, Cadet New Recruit, when they begin ACP at their school. It is possible for a Cadet to ascend in ranks if the Cadet’s performance is excellent, and it is also possible to receive demotions and lower the rank of a Cadet if he performs poorly or disrespects his commanding officer.

Citizenship
Cadets in the ACP learn patriotism and pride in their nationality, and are punished for disrespecting their homeland, the Philippines. For example, cadets are punished if they run during the playing or singing of the Philippine National Anthem. Cadets are likewise punished even more severely for disrespecting the Philippine flag (letting any portion of the flag touch the ground is worthy of a demotion). Cadets are encouraged to sing the National Anthem with pride. Cadets are also encouraged to recite the Panatang Makabayan and the Panunumpa ng Katapatan sa Watawat, as well as sing their school's alma mater song with zest and valor.

Military training
Being an extension of the Philippine Air Force, ACP requires students to learn military commands, drills, punishments, the military alphabet, and obedience to the commanding officer. Commands are mostly in Tagalog, such as 'Manumbalik', 'Humanay', 'Tikas', 'Paluwag', 'Pasulong', 'Lihis pakanan/pakaliwa', 'Liko pakanan/pakaliwa', and 'Kaliwang/Kanang panig'. Cadets also learn how to handle an M16 rifle, however, guns are forbidden in schools, so replicas of M16 rifles are used instead, and the proper use of sabers. ACP requires students to wear a military uniform (Known in some schools as General Officers Attire or GOA, and in others as General Officers Uniform or GOU), which is inspected every training day (this includes the proper military haircut of the boys and hair do for girls). Also, ACP cadets have their own Cadet Oath and Honor Code, which must be memorized.

This form of military training is said to give a sense of nationalism and instill self-discipline (the highest form of discipline) in the youth, so that the youth can be of service to the Philippines.

List of schools currently affiliated with the ACP

The first five schools to implement ACP
Colegio San Agustin-Makati
St. John's Academy
FEATI University
Las Piñas College
Mindanao Aeronautical & Technical School

Schools that presently implement ACP
University of Perpetual Help System DALTA, Las Piñas
Montessori De Manila, Las Piñas
Marie Ernestine School, Lapu-Lapu, Cebu
La Consolacion College, Caloocan
South Crest School, Muntinlupa
The Nazarene Catholic School
Lycée D'Regis Marie of Parañaque City
La Consolacion College, Biñan, Laguna
Our Lady of Perpetual Help School, Santolan, Pasig
Mary Mother of God Parochial School, Muntinlupa
St. John's Academy, San Juan
Elizabeth Seton School, Las Piñas
Sto. Rosario Academy, Alupay, Batangas
Holy Family Academy, Padre Garcia, Batangas
Our Lady of Mercy Academy, Batangas
St. James Academy, Ibaan, Batangas
Holy Trinity, Padre Garcia, Batangas
Holy Trinity, Mataas na Kahoy, Batangas
St. Joseph's Institute, Rosario, Batangas
Talisay High School Talisay, Batangas
Joseph Marello Institute San Juan, Batangas
Oblates of Saint Joseph Minor Seminary (OSJMS), San Jose, Batangas
Angeles University Foundation - Integrated School Angeles City
Maria Montessori School of Quezon City, Quezon City
St. Paul College of Parañaque
PAREF Southridge, Muntinlupa
Pasay
San Isidro Catholic School, Pasay
Parañaque
Veritas Catholic School, Parañaque
 St Joseph's Academy, Las Piñas
Davao Wisdom Academy, Davao City
Our Lady of Lourdes College Foundation, Daet, Camarines Norte
San Isidro Catholic School, Pasay
Colegio De San Lorenzo, Quezon City
Indiana Aerospace University, Lapu-Lapu City
Dee Hwa Liong Academy Inc., Pasig, City
The Palmridge School, Bacoor
The Palmridge School, General Trias
South City Homes Academy
Advance Institute of Technology, Inc., Lapu-Lapu City
San Lorenzo Ruiz School, P.Rodriguez St., Lapu-Lapu City
 St. Joseph's School - Mactan, Lapu-Lapu City
Sacred Heart of Jesus Catholic School (SHJCS), Santa Mesa, Manila
San Felipe Neri Parochial School, Mandaluyong
Jaime Cardinal Sin Learning Center, Punta Sta. Ana Manila
San Felipe Neri Parochial School, Mandaluyong
University of Perpetual Help System DALTA, Calamba, Laguna
Holy Child Catholic School, Tondo, Manila
Schola de Vita, Las Piñas
Saint Anthony Montessori - Integrated School, Dasmariñas
International Christian Academy, Parañaque
Saint Paul College of Parañaque, Parañaque
Upper Villages Christian Academy (UVCA), San Pedro, Laguna
West Visayas State University - Integrated Laboratory School (WVSU-ILS), La Paz, Iloilo City
Saint Anthony Montessori - Integrated School Salawag, Dasmariñas, Cavite

Schools that used to implement ACP
Manresa School, Parañaque
Saint Jude Academy, Valenzuela City
Colegio de Sta. Cecilia, Valenzuela City
Caritas Don Bosco School, Biñan, Laguna
Laguna State University
FEATI University
Las Piñas College
Mindanao Aeronautical & Technical School
La Consolacion College – Daet, Camarines Norte
Flos Carmeli Institute, Fairview, Quezon City
Cebu Institute of Technology – University

See also 
Cadet rank in the Philippines

Philippines educational programs
Education in the Philippines
Science and technology in the Philippines
Aerospace